Rah Niz (also Romanized as Rāh Nīz; also known as Rānīz) is a village in Balvard Rural District, in the Central District of Sirjan County, Kerman Province, Iran. At the 2006 census, its population was 55, in 11 families.

References 

Populated places in Sirjan County